Miroslav Januš (born 9 August 1972 in Postupice, Czechoslovakia) is a Czech sport shooter. A four-time Olympian (1992 to 2004), Janus is one of Czech Republic's most successful individual shooters in Olympic history, having won a bronze medal in the 10 m running target at Atlanta 1996. Outside his Olympic career, Janus has produced a career record of 120 medals in a major international competition, including fourteen golds at the European Championships, and a total of ten in different color at the Worlds since his debut came as a junior in 1989.

Career
Started shooting at the age of fourteen, Janus ascended to prominence in the international scene as part of the former Czechoslovakia team in 1989. By that time, he set a junior world record of 566 in the running target to successfully claim his first ever gold medal at the World Championships in Sarajevo, Yugoslavia. Janus' early rise continued as he improved his personal best by six points for another Worlds title two years later in Stavanger, Norway. He made his first Czech team at the 1992 Summer Olympics in Barcelona, but failed to reach the final in the inaugural 10 m running target, finishing ninth with a score of 572.

In 1995, Janus reached the peak of his shooting career by breaking a new world record of 685.5 in the running target to earn a gold medal at the ISSF World Cup meet in Seoul, South Korea. Janus' exceptional dominance clearly made him one of the top favorites vying for an Olympic medal at his succeeding Games in Atlanta 1996. Indeed, he progressed to the 10 m running target final with a third seed at 580, and then shot brilliantly a 98.4 in the 10-shot round to give the Czechs an Olympic bronze for a total score of 678.4, trailing the Chinese duo of Yang Ling and Xiao Jun by just a few points.

The following season, Janus established his new personal best of 685.7 to assert himself with a blazing first-place finish at the 1997 World Cup final in Lugano, Switzerland in addition to his third straight victory from the European Championships, erasing his own record that he previously set two years earlier in Seoul by just a slim tenth of a point margin (0.1).

Heading to his third Olympic Games in Sydney 2000 with confidence and luck, Janus was expected to be an overwhelming medal favorite for the Czechs, but in the 10 m running target, he put up a lackluster effort with a modest 91.8 on the 10-shot series, that shut him out of the podium to last in the eight-man final, accumulating a total score of 666.8. Earlier, Janus shot a slow-running 293 and a wretched 282 on the fast run to get a fifth-seeded score of 575 for the final.

The post-Sydney Olympics period sought a real test and a mighty redemption on Janus at the same shooting range two years later for the World Cup series. There, he commanded a robust two-point lead over the Russian tandem of Aleksandr Blinov and World champion Dimitri Lykin to claim the gold with 681.7, and secure an Olympic quota place for the Czech Republic towards his fourth straight Games.

Before the 2004 Summer Olympics in Athens, Janus held off a formidable challenge from Lykin to collect another gold in an Olympic test event at Markópoulo Olympic Shooting Centre, as part of the World Cup series, finishing in the lead at 685.5. Upon entering the Games as an Olympic medal favorite, Janus suddenly crashed out of the men's 10 m running target final with a disastrous feat in the qualifying round. He marked a lowly 283 on the slow-target and 281 on the fast run to finish a startling fifteenth out of 19 shooters with a total score of 564, just fourteen points away from the final cutoff.

Olympic results

References

External links

Czech Olympic Team Bio 

1972 births
Living people
Czech male sport shooters
Olympic shooters of Czechoslovakia
Olympic shooters of the Czech Republic
Shooters at the 1992 Summer Olympics
Shooters at the 1996 Summer Olympics
Shooters at the 2000 Summer Olympics
Shooters at the 2004 Summer Olympics
Olympic bronze medalists for the Czech Republic
Olympic medalists in shooting
Medalists at the 1996 Summer Olympics
People from Benešov District
Sportspeople from the Central Bohemian Region